Amblyptilia pica, the geranium plume moth, is a moth of the family Pterophoridae. The species was first described by Baron Walsingham in 1880. It is found in western North America from Alaska to California, inland to Alberta and Kansas. It is also found in the north-eastern United States and Ontario.

Adults have dark grey forewings mottled with black. They are on wing in spring and fall and have been recorded feeding on the flower nectar of Salix species.

The larvae feed on Scrophulariaceae, Geraniaceae, Primulaceae, Labiatae and Caprifoliaceae species, including Castilleja species, Pedicularis furbishiae and Scrophularia californica, Penstemon whippleanus. They feed externally on the foliage and flower buds of their host plant, but also bore into the seedpods and mine the leaves. The species overwinters as an adult.

Taxonomy
A number of subspecies has been described, but it is unclear which, if any, are still valid:
 Amblyptilia pica pica
 Amblyptilia pica calisequoiae (Lange, 1950)
 Amblyptilia pica marina (Lange, 1950)
 Amblyptilia pica sierrae (Lange, 1950)
 Amblyptilia pica monticola (Grinnell, 1908)
 Amblyptilia pica crataea (T. B. Fletcher, 1940)

References

Moths described in 1880
Amblyptilia
Moths of North America